Shelta (Irish: Seiltis) is a language spoken by Rilantu Mincéirí (Irish Travellers), particularly in Ireland and the United Kingdom. It is widely known as the Cant, to its native speakers in Ireland as De Gammon, and to the linguistic community as Shelta. The exact number of native speakers is hard to determine due to sociolinguistic issues but Ethnologue puts the number of speakers at 30,000 in the UK, 6,000 in Ireland, and 50,000 in the US. The figure for at least the UK is dated to 1990; it is not clear if the other figures are from the same source.

Linguistically Shelta is today seen as a mixed language that stems from a community of travelling people in Ireland that was originally predominantly Irish-speaking. The community later went through a period of widespread bilingualism that resulted in a language based heavily on Hiberno-English with heavy influences from Irish. As different varieties of Shelta display different degrees of anglicisation, it is hard to determine the extent of the Irish substratum. The Oxford Companion to the English Language puts it at 2,000–3,000 words.

Names and etymology
The language is known by various names. People outside the Irish Traveller community often refer to it as (the) Cant, the etymology of which is a matter of debate. Speakers of the language refer to it as (the) Cant, Gammon or Tarri. Amongst linguists, the name Shelta is the most commonly used term.

Variants of the above names and additional names include Bog Latin, Gammon, Sheldru, Shelter, Shelteroch, the Ould Thing, and Tinker's Cant.

Etymology
The word Shelta appears in print for the first time in 1882 in the book The Gypsies by the "gypsiologist" Charles Leland, who claimed to have discovered it as the "fifth Celtic tongue". The word's etymology has long been a matter of debate. Modern Celticists believe that Irish   "to walk" is at the root, either via a term such as   "a walker" or a form of the verbal noun  (cf. an lucht siúlta , "the walking people" (lit. "the people of walks"), the traditional Irish term for Travellers). The Dictionary of Hiberno-English cites it as possibly a corruption of the word "Celt". Since Shelta is a mixture of English and Irish grammar, the etymology is not straightforward. The language is made up mostly of Irish lexicon, being classified as a grammar-lexicon language with the grammar being English-based.

Origins and history
Linguists have been documenting Shelta since at least the 1870s. The first works were published in 1880 and 1882 by Charles Leland. Celtic language expert Kuno Meyer and Romani expert John Sampson both assert that Shelta existed as far back as the 13th century.

In the earliest but undocumented period linguists surmise that the Traveller community was Irish-speaking until a period of widespread bilingualism in Irish and Hiberno-English (or Scots in Scotland) set in, leading to creolisation (possibly with a trilingual stage). The resulting language is referred to as Old Shelta and it is suspected that this stage of the language displayed distinctive features, such as non-English syntactic and morphological features, no longer found in Shelta.

Within the diaspora, various sub-branches of Shelta exist. English Shelta is increasingly undergoing anglicisation, while American Irish-Traveller's Cant, originally also synonymous with Shelta, has by now been almost fully anglicised.

Linguistic features
Sociologist Sharon Gmelch describes the Irish Travellers' language as follows:

Thus, by design, it is not mutually intelligible with either English or Irish.

Shelta is a secret language. Travellers do not like to share the language with outsiders, named "Buffers", or non-travellers. When speaking Shelta in front of Buffers, Travellers will disguise the structure so as to make it seem like they aren't speaking Shelta at all.

Lexicon
While Shelta is influenced by English grammar, it is also a mixture of Gaelic and Irish words as well. The word order itself is altered, syllables are reversed, and many of the original words are Irish that have been altered or reversed. Many Shelta words have been disguised using techniques such as back slang where sounds are transposed (for example gop "kiss" from Irish póg) or the addition of sounds (for example gather "father" from Irish athair). Other examples include lackin or lakeen "girl" from Irish cailín, and the word rodas "door" from Irish doras. The word for "son" is changed from the Gaelic mac to the Shelta kam.

Grammar
Shelta shares its main syntactic features with Hiberno-English and the majority of its morphological features such as -s plurals and past tense markers. Compare:

There is not as much importance put on gender in Shelta. Plurals are shown with the English suffix /–s/ or /-i/, such as gloχ for "man" becomes gloχi for "men".

Phonology 
Shelta has 27 consonants and 10 vowels.

Many words are complex by incorporating numerous consonants within, as in the word skraχo for "tree, bush' with the consonant /χ/ being a hissing sound that is held in the back of the throat, and is held longer than other consonants.

Loanwords
Some Shelta words have been borrowed by mainstream English speakers, such as the word "bloke" meaning "a man" in the mid-19th century.

Orthography
There is no standard orthography. Broadly speaking, Shelta can either be written following an Irish-type orthography or an English-type orthography. For example, the word for "married" can either be spelled lósped or lohsped, a "woman" can either be spelled byohr or beoir.

Comparison texts
Below are reproductions of the Lord's Prayer in Shelta as it occurred a century ago, current Shelta, and modern English and Irish versions for comparison. The 19th century Shelta version shows a high Shelta lexical content while the Cant version shows a much lower Shelta lexical content. Both versions are adapted from Hancock who notes that the Cant reproduction is not exactly representative of actual speech in normal situations.

.

See also
 Irish Travellers
 Beurla Reagaird
 Bungi Creole
 Polari

References

Bibliography
R. A. Stewart Macalister (1937) The Secret Languages of Ireland: with special reference to the origin and nature of the Shelta language, partly based upon collections and manuscripts of the late John Sampson. Cambridge University Press (reissued by Craobh Rua Books, Armagh, 1997)

External links
Shelta lexicon and pronunciation guide

Cant languages
English-based argots
English-based pidgins and creoles
Irish dialects
Macaronic forms of English
Irish Travellers
Languages of Ireland
Languages of the Republic of Ireland